Čohovo ( or  or ) is a small abandoned settlement above Sveti Vid in the Municipality of Cerknica in the Inner Carniola region of Slovenia.

Geography 
Čohovo is a clustered village on the southwest slope of Čoh Hill (Čohov grič), which is covered in needleleaf forest. It stands along the road from Osredek to Ravne. Beden Spring lies below the village toward the Iška River and was used in the past for as a water source for the village. Štembuh Spring, located near the wayside shrine in Čohovo, was outfitted with a trough for watering animals.

References

External links 

Čohovo on Geopedia

Populated places in the Municipality of Cerknica